Collegiate a cappella (or college a cappella) ensembles are college-affiliated singing groups, primarily in the United States, and, increasingly, the United Kingdom and Ireland, that perform entirely without musical instruments. The groups are typically composed of, operated by, and directed by students. In the context of collegiate a cappella, the term a cappella typically also refers to the music genre performed by pop-centric student singing groups. Consequently, an ensemble that sings unaccompanied classical music may not be considered an a cappella group, even though technically it is performing a cappella.

According to the nonfiction book Pitch Perfect, a cappella music is one of the oldest forms of music in existence, "the kind made without any accompaniment at all," and descended from the tradition of Gregorian chant. A cappella music as a form joined this early form with a later Puritan style, known as shape-note singing, which further extended into the American Gospel tradition. Further permutations leaked into the American pop landscape. Today, by some accounts, there exist as many as “twelve hundred collegiate a cappella groups in the United States alone.”

History
The RPI Glee Club of Rensselaer Polytechnic Institute, established in 1873, was one of the earliest known collegiate a cappella groups. The longest continuously-operating group is thought to be The Whiffenpoofs of Yale University, which was formed in 1909 to create a musical group with a more "modern" sound than that of the Yale Glee Club, and named for the lyrics to Little Nemo, a popular Broadway song at the time. Such names, normally intended for comedic effect, have come to define in some part the irreverent attitude found in modern collegiate a cappella. For example, the second-oldest continuously performing a cappella group (and oldest all-male group) is Yale's Society of Orpheus and Bacchus, or "SOB's".  The first a cappella groups at other American Ivy League Universities include Notes and Keys of Columbia, which were founded in 1909, the same year as the Whiffenpoofs; the Princeton Nassoons (c.1941); the Dartmouth Aires (1946); the Harvard Krokodiloes (1946); Cayuga's Waiters of Cornell University (1949); and the Jabberwocks of Brown University (1949).

The Vassar College Night Owls (1942) are the oldest continuous soprano/alto a cappella group. The Night Owls are a jazz ensemble who perform in all-black clothing. The Night Owls maintain over 40 orally-taught arrangements, some dating back to the founding members.

In recent years, online a cappella communities have come together, allowing for greater involvement in the shaping of modern a cappella music, including stylistic trends. Among the most prominent online a cappella presences are The A Cappella Blog, Varsity Vocals, and CASA (The Contemporary A Cappella Society). According to The A Cappella Blog's information section, “The A Cappella Blog was founded in January 2007. Since that time, the site has reviewed over 40 International Championship of Collegiate A Cappella competitions. In addition, the site has featured interviews with over 50 a cappella groups and major figures in the a cappella community, including Ben Folds, Jerry Lawson, and Straight No Chaser. The A Cappella Blog has also published guest posts by Mickey Rapkin, Deke Sharon, Amanda Newman, and Bill Hare.”

Similarly, the Varsity Vocals compose an international a cappella organization based around their two main competitions, the ICCAs (International Competition of Collegiate A Cappella) and the ICHSA (International Competition of High School A Cappella). According to their website, “owned and operated by Varsity Vocals, the competitions receive applications each fall. For groups accepted to the tournament, ICCA shows are held in three rounds – Quarterfinals, Semifinals, and Finals. Roughly, Quarterfinals are held in January and February, Semifinals in March, and Finals in April in New York City. ICHSA shows are held in Semifinal and Final rounds throughout the spring, culminating with Finals in April in New York City.” 

Collegiate a cappella is by far most common in the United States from which it originated; however in recent decades the trend has spread beyond to universities in the United Kingdom and the Republic of Ireland in Europe as well as up North into Canada and across the Pacific into Australia, New Zealand and a few nations in Asia.

Modern growth
College a cappella has grown rapidly since 1980. This growth was fueled in part by stylistic changes that had widespread appeal, and in part by the founding in 1991 of The Contemporary A Cappella Society (CASA) by Deke Sharon and Rex Solomon, which enabled interaction and collaboration of a cappella groups across the United States for the first time.

Deke Sharon, a member of the Tufts a cappella group The Beelzebubs, co-created CASA after two years spent tenured as the historic group's musical director. Deke Sharon sought to bring a cappella into the musical mainstream, popularizing a more pop format for the music, as well as helping to contribute to a standardization of a cappella performance through the founding of CASA.

One of CASA's core values in its promotion of the a cappella community is that of innovation, stating “We develop new methods for singers, groups, fans, and educators to sing, learn, connect, and interact with one another.”

The new style used voices to emulate modern rock instruments, marking a shift away from the more traditional sounds of jazz or classical ensembles and glee clubs to contemporary a cappella, with groups focusing on modern pop music, complete with complex textures and a driving beat (see vocal percussion). Today, even some glee clubs have a largely pop-music repertoire supplemented only in small part by the traditional genres.

In modern competing A Cappella groups, there are several techniques that are making each group more and more distinctive. Beatboxing is at the top among them, but tone, sound effects, style, blend, and harmonies are all unique, too.

Performance styles
Collegiate a cappella spans many music genres and styles including alternative and hard rock, comedy, Jewish (including mostly Yiddish or Hebrew songs), Christian (including Christian pop and rearranged hymns), South Asian fusion (mainly composed of youth of South Asian origin or heritage), jazz-influenced pop, fusion, barbershop, Rhythm and Blues, madrigals, and jazz. Differences in musical styles and individual group preferences result in a great diversity of music arrangements and performances.

Costume
The costumes, and uniforms that the groups display, present a message to the audience. That may be in matching, not matching, formal, informal, and many more. Each group has a "brand" and a "look/style" to their members. Costumes can be whatever a group wants them to be, but aesthetic appearances is a pleasing visual for the audience and, most importantly, the judges.

Choreography
Within the ICCAs and ICHSAs is a point system. Each groups is judged based on several things, some of which including sound, blend, harmonies, costume, choreography, and many more. Choreography is a big factor in determining how many points a group will get, and how clean and precise their movements are, is also vital.

Arch sing

An "arch sing" is a casual, public performance, often held in an archway for reasons of acoustics and shelter from the weather. Typically, one or more a cappella groups will perform for a small audience, either as a concert or to promote upcoming concerts. The term is also sometimes used to describe similar casual, outdoor performances not held under arches.

Live techniques
In recent years, with the advent of more advanced audio equipment and the ability of a cappella groups to attract income with live performances for pay, there has been increased exploration into the importance of microphones. Whereas groups at schools with older campuses find themselves with arches and naturally acoustically accentuated spaces in which to perform, many groups find themselves lacking spaces such as these. As has been documented and encouraged by various a cappella organizations, such as CASA, Varsity Vocals, and The A Cappella Blog, individual microphone use for each member of an ensemble has risen in popularity, allowing for, as Mike Chin of the A Cappella Blog states, a “big,” “clear,” “crisp” sound in an otherwise acoustically dull performance space. In addition, the use of individual microphones allows for added effects to be applied to a group's live vocals, such as adding a digital lower octave (or "octavizing") the bass vocalist to produce a tone that is outside the natural range of most singers. The integration of these technological advancements continues to shape the sound of modern a cappella music at the college level and beyond.

Group structure and culture
Most collegiate a cappella groups, whether all-male identifying, all-female identifying, or mixed, share similar traits. The groups often benefit from the talent of non-music majors who have significant experience with music, choral singing, or both. Participation in such groups provides both a social and creative outlet for students who are pursuing other academic fields. Groups are generally self-sustaining and often entirely run by students. Some groups receive financial support from their educational institution while others are entirely self-supporting.

Unlike professional groups, which typically have four to seven members, collegiate groups typically perform with eight to sixteen members, with full group rosters measuring up to 30 members in some cases. This large roster size is often driven by necessity, as college groups tend to see high turnover due to graduation and changing student commitments. A large member count enables a group to maintain continuity over time and it also affects the group's aural aesthetic. For example, a large group may be able to perform arrangements that have more than a dozen separate parts, an impossible feat for smaller groups.

Some groups record albums of their music, typically at intervals of two or three years. The quality of such albums has recently improved markedly due to an increased focus on multi-track recording, greater access to home recording technology, and the emergence of professional a cappella production specialists (including arrangers, vocal editors, and mix/mastering engineers). Achievements in collegiate a cappella recording are recognized by awards programs (e.g., the Contemporary A Cappella Recording Awards, awarded by CASA) and compilation albums, such as the long-running Best of College A Cappella series.

The bigger the groups, the more the groups tend to really connect. Through all the rehearsals, learning the differences of your peers, yet sharing the same goal, can be challenging. Competing also brings about club unity and encourages the groups to share personal experiences the group has gone through together.

Many college groups compete in annual competitions organized by the International Championship of Collegiate A Cappella (ICCA), which conducts various regional competitions, with winners of regional competitions advancing to a national competition.

See also
List of collegiate a cappella groups
List of collegiate a cappella groups in the UK
List of alumni of collegiate a cappella groups
Pitch Perfect, an American comedy film which revolves around collegiate a cappella groups

References

External links
 Directory of Collegiate A Cappella Groups, by university.
The Contemporary A Cappella Society (of America), a repository of resources regarding contemporary a cappella.  Deke Sharon, founder of CASA, has co-produced every Best of College A Cappella (BOCA) CD since 1995.
Voices Only College A Cappella, Annual compilation CD of collegiate a cappella.
Varsity Vocals, an organization dedicated to the growth and development of contemporary a cappella at the secondary school and collegiate level.  Varsity Vocals produces the Best of College A Cappella (BOCA) compilation, as well as the International Championship of Collegiate A Cappella (ICCA) and the International Championship of High School A Cappella (ICHSA).
Recorded A Cappella Review Board, RARB is an a cappella album review service. RARB features over 650 album reviews, many of which are collegiate groups.

A cappella
Student culture in the United States